Wayne Pashley is an Australian supervising sound editor, sound designer and re-recording mixer.

Wayne was nominated for an Academy Award in the category of Best Sound for the film Elvis.

Career
Wayne started his career in the early-1980s as a sound editor at the Australian Broadcasting Corporation. He has worked on over 90 films and television series since 1987. He is a co-founder of Big Bang Sound Design.

Selected filmography
 2023 – Wolf Like Me
 2022 – Elvis
 2021 – Life in Colour
 2019 – Little Monsters
 2017 – The Lego Ninjago Movie
 2017 – The Lego Batman Movie
 2016 – Gods of Egypt
 2015 – Mad Max: Fury Road
 2014 – The Water Diviner
 2014 – The Lego Movie
 2013 – The Great Gatsby
 2011 – Happy Feet Two
 2010 – Legend of the Guardians: The Owls of Ga'Hoole
 2009 – Daybreakers
 2008 – Australia
 2006 – Happy Feet
 2002 – The Crocodile Hunter: Collision Course
 1998 – Babe: Pig in the City
 1997 – Kiss or Kill
 1995 – Babe

Selected awards and nominations

Academy Awards

BAFTA Film Awards

AACTA Awards

Australian Screen Sound Guild

Motion Picture Sound Editors

References

External links
 
 

Living people
Australian audio engineers
Sound editors
Sound designers
Australian sound editors
Year of birth missing (living people)